The Cobre Valley Institute of Technology (CVIT) is a joint technological education district serving east-central Arizona.

Member high schools
Hayden High School
Globe High School
Miami High School
San Carlos High School
Superior High School

External links
Official website

School districts in Arizona